Luca Fieschi ( – 31 January 1336) was a Genoese nobleman and Roman Catholic cardinal from 1300.

A member of the Fieschi family and a relative of the Plantagenets, he held benefices in England and Italy. Although politically a Guelph, he was chosen to be a part of the papal delegation that accompanied Henry VII of Germany in Italy in 1311–1312. In 1317–1318, he was part of a legation to England and Scotland that failed to end the Anglo-Scottish war. His later years were spent in Avignon, where he amassed great wealth and a large household.

Family
Fieschi was born around 1275 or slightly earlier to Niccolò di Tedisio, count of Lavagna, and Leonora (Lionetta). His great uncle was Pope Innocent IV. In 1276, his paternal uncle became Pope Adrian V. Fieschi relations included the Malaspina family and the Visconti of Milan.

He was also related to the Plantagenets, the ruling family of England. In 1301, he was referred to as a kinsman of King Edward I. The exact relationship is unclear, but was through Fieschi's mother, whose ancestry is uncertain. According to his own testimony in 1300, Fieschi was also related to King James II of Aragon, which suggests a Savoyard connection. He was either the third or fourth cousin of Edward II of England.

Early career
By 1297, Fieschi was a papal chaplain and subdeacon. In 1297, he succeeded his elder brother, Brancaleone, in a canonry of the diocese of Lichfield, being exempted from the requirements of residency and age. In 1298, he was made a canon of Paris. In March 1300, Pope Boniface VIII appointed him to the cardinalate as deacon of Santa Maria in Via Lata. At the same time, he was assigned the churches of Santi Cosma e Damiano and San Marcello al Corso, which had been taken from Boniface's personal enemy, Cardinal Giacomo Colonna. In 1301, he visited England.

According to a late and unreliable tradition, Fieschi rallied the citizens of Anagni to rescue Boniface when the latter was imprisoned by conspirators during the Affair of Anagni in 1303.

In the 1304–1305 papal conclave, he supported Cardinal Matteo Rosso Orsini before the latter's death. He travelled to Lyon to attend the coronation of Clement V. At the invitation of the Black Guelph faction, he stopped in Florence along the way and received gifts.

Italian years, 1311–1316
After Clement moved to Avignon in 1309, Fieschi continued to work in Italy. In the summer of 1311, he was part of the papal delegation sent to meet Henry VII of Germany, who was marching into Italy for his imperial coronation. The other delegates were Cardinals  and Niccolò da Prato. The cardinals followed Henry to Genoa in October and to Rome, where he was crowned on 29 June 1312. Niccolò anointed Henry, while Arnaud and Fieschi invested him with the mitre, diadem, orb, sceptre and sword on behalf of the absent pope. After the coronation, Fieschi received a gift of money from Henry, whom he followed to Tivoli. He left the emperor before the siege of Florence and went to Lucca.

In Lucca, Fieschi was charged by Clement V with safeguarding the papal treasure that the late Cardinal Gentile da Montefiore had been bringing from Rome to Avignon at his death in October 1312. He and Niccolò da Prato deposited it in the Dominican convent there, but in 1314 it was plundered by Uguccione della Faggiuola. While still at Lucca in 1313, Fieschi seems to have negotiated with imperial representatives to secure the appointment of himself and his brothers, Carlo and Ottobono, as lords of the castle of Pontremoli, which their father had received as an imperial fief from King William in 1251.

Anglo-Scottish legation, 1317–1318
In 1316, Pope John XXII succeeded Clement V. He demanded Fieschi justify his continued absence in writing. He also withheld from him the subsidy granted to the other cardinals on the occasion of his coronation. Fieschi returned to Avignon after five years in Italy on 17 November 1316. In May 1317, he left Avignon with Cardinal Gauscelin de Jean on a legation to reconcile Edward II of England and Robert I of Scotland and to instruct Edward to turn over the former properties of the Templars to the Hospitallers.

Fieschi and Jean arrived in Dover in June 1317 and were in London by 17 June. In July, they set out for Scotland. On 1 September 1317, while escorting the bishop-elect Louis de Beaumont and his brother, Henry de Beaumont, to Durham for the former's consecration and enthronement, they were robbed by Gilbert de Middleton and his men near Rushyford. The Beaumonts were taken captive, while the cardinals were allowed to go on to Durham. Their goods, however, were seized. Some of their entourage were killed. In response, the pope sent them 1,000 florins in compensation. Durham Priory granted Fieschi a lifetime pension of 100 florins, according to the chronicle attributed to Robert de Graystanes. The cardinals excommunicated Middleton and his associates and, per the Vita Edwardi Secundi, suspended their mission until they had received satisfaction from Parliament. The king gave £346 to Fieschi for his troubles.

The mission to Scotland was a failure, as Robert I refused to make peace with Edward II. The papal truce terms were published by the cardinals in London on 27 November, but were never published in Scotland. On 21 or 21 October, the pope wrote the cardinals warning them of his impending bull Execrabilis, which would revoke all benefices in England held in plurality for papal provision. During their legation, Fieschi and Jean also visited Oxford University and intervened in the ongoing Canterbury–York dispute. Fieschi appointed a procurator for his benefices in Lichfield and Tirrington for a term of twelve years. He also received some benefices from the king. The legates departed London for Avignon on 18 September 1318.

Avignonese years, 1319–1336
In 1319–1322, Fieschi reportedly became a close confidant of King Robert of Naples, who often stayed at Avignon. In 1319, he lent 9,500 florins to the Guelphs of Genoa to help finance their defence against the Ghibelline siege. He took the Sacro Catino relic as collateral. It was final returned when the loan was repaid in 1340. In 1322, the pope assigned him and Cardinal Giovanni Gaetano Orsini to reconcile Robert with King James II of Aragon. According to the Catalans Vidal de Vilanova and Ferrer d'Abella, he was a staunch defender of the Aragonese policy at the time of the conquest of Sardinia in 1323.

In 1321, Pontremoli was captured by Castruccio Castracani degli Antelminelli. In March and May 1325, Fieschi received royal protection from Edward II, but there is no evidence that he visited England.

Fieschi was a patron of the physician and crusade theorist Galvano da Levanto. Nevertheless, he was opposed to the planned crusade of Philip V of France and urged John XXII to spend the assigned money closer to home. He had developed a reputation for extravagant living. He rented eight houses in Avignon, one for twenty years at the time of his death. His household consisted of around a hundred servants, including fifteen chaplains, four physicians and two notaries. One of his household was Manuele Fieschi, author of the Fieschi Letter. His library contained around a hundred books, about a third of them pertaining to canon law. He owned an autograph copy of the Decretals of Innocent IV and a probable autograph copy of Galvano da Levanto's theological treatises.

Death
Fieschi drew up his final will at Avignon on 31 January 1336. He died later that same day. His body was embalmed and brought to Genoa for burial in the cathedral of San Lorenzo. The rights he inherited in Pontremoli from his brother Federico he left to the descendants of his brother Carlo. His tomb in Genoa was carved by a master connected with the school of Giovanni Pisano.

Because of the great wealth which he left behind, more is recorded about Fieschi's death than his life. Three of the letters concern Armenia, Egypt and Beirut.

Notes

Bibliography

1270s births
1336 deaths
Fieschi family
13th-century Genoese people
14th-century Genoese people
Cardinal-deacons
13th-century Italian cardinals
14th-century Italian cardinals